Voronezh is a rural locality (a settlement) in Karamyshevsky Selsoviet, Zmeinogorsky District, Altai Krai, Russia. The population was 202 as of 2013. There are 4 streets.

Geography 
Voronezh is located 14 km northwest of Zmeinogorsk (the district's administrative centre) by road. Karamyshevo is the nearest rural locality.

References 

Rural localities in Zmeinogorsky District